The following outline is provided as an overview of and topical guide to Ivory Coast:

Ivory Coast – country in West Africa. An 1843–1844 treaty made Ivory Coast a protectorate of France and in 1893, it became a French colony as part of the European scramble for Africa. Ivory Coast became independent on 7 August 1960. Through production of coffee and cocoa, the country was an economic powerhouse during the 1960s and 1970s in West Africa. However, Ivory Coast went through an economic crisis in the 1980s, leading to the country's period of political and social turmoil. The 21st century Ivorian economy is largely market-based and relies heavily on agriculture, with smallholder cash crop production being dominant. The country's official name is the Republic of Côte d'Ivoire.

General reference

 Pronunciation: 
 Common English country name: Ivory Coast or Ivory Coast
 Official English country name: République de Côté d’Ivoire
 Common endonym(s): Côte d'Ivoire.
 Official endonym(s): Republic of Côte d'Ivoire.
 Adjectival(s): Ivorian (Ivoirien)
 Demonym(s):
 ISO country codes: CI, CIV, 384
 ISO region codes: See ISO 3166-2:CI
 Internet country code top-level domain: .ci

Geography of Ivory Coast 

 Ivory Coast is: a country
 Population of Ivory Coast: 19,262,000  - 57th most populous country
 Area of Ivory Coast: 322,460 km2
 Atlas of Ivory Coast

Location 
 Ivory Coast is situated within the following regions
 Northern Hemisphere and Western Hemisphere
 Africa
 West Africa
 Time zone:  Coordinated Universal Time UTC+00
 Extreme points of Ivory Coast
 High:  Mont Nimba 
 Low:  Gulf of Guinea 0 m
 Land boundaries:  3,110 km
 716 km
 668 km
 610 km
 584 km
 532 km
 Coastline:  515 km

Environment of Ivory Coast 

 Climate of Ivory Coast
 Ecoregions in Ivory Coast
Protected areas of Ivory Coast]
 National parks of Ivory Coast
 Wildlife of Ivory Coast
 Fauna of Ivory Coast
 Birds of Ivory Coast
 Mammals of Ivory Coast

Natural geographic features of Ivory Coast 
 Glaciers in Ivory Coast: none
 Rivers of Ivory Coast
 World Heritage Sites in Ivory Coast

Regions of Ivory Coast

Ecoregions of Ivory Coast

Administrative divisions of Ivory Coast 
Administrative divisions of Ivory Coast
 Regions of Ivory Coast
 Departments of Ivory Coast

Departments of Ivory Coast

Municipalities of Ivory Coast 
 Capital of Ivory Coast: Yamoussoukro, formerly Abidjan
 Cities of Ivory Coast

Demography of Ivory Coast 
Demographics of Ivory Coast

Government and politics of Ivory Coast 
Politics of Ivory Coast
 Form of government: presidential republic
 Capital of Ivory Coast: Yamoussoukro, formerly Abidjan
 Elections in Ivory Coast

Executive branch of the government of Ivory Coast 
 Head of state: President of Ivory Coast,
 Head of government: Prime Minister of Ivory Coast,

Legislative branch of the government of Ivory Coast 
 National Assembly (Ivory Coast) (unicameral parliament)

Judicial branch of the government of Ivory Coast

Foreign relations of Ivory Coast 

 Diplomatic missions in Ivory Coast
 Diplomatic missions of Ivory Coast

International organization membership 
The Republic of Ivory Coast is a member of:

African, Caribbean, and Pacific Group of States (ACP)
African Development Bank Group (AfDB)
African Union (AU)
Conference des Ministres des Finances des Pays de la Zone Franc (FZ)
Council of the Entente (Entente)
Economic Community of West African States (ECOWAS)
Food and Agriculture Organization (FAO)
Group of 24 (G24)
Group of 77 (G77)
International Atomic Energy Agency (IAEA)
International Bank for Reconstruction and Development (IBRD)
International Civil Aviation Organization (ICAO)
International Criminal Court (ICCt) (signatory)
International Criminal Police Organization (Interpol)
International Development Association (IDA)
International Federation of Red Cross and Red Crescent Societies (IFRCS)
International Finance Corporation (IFC)
International Fund for Agricultural Development (IFAD)
International Labour Organization (ILO)
International Maritime Organization (IMO)
International Monetary Fund (IMF)
International Olympic Committee (IOC)
International Organization for Migration (IOM)
International Red Cross and Red Crescent Movement (ICRM)
International Telecommunication Union (ITU)
International Telecommunications Satellite Organization (ITSO)

International Trade Union Confederation (ITUC)
Inter-Parliamentary Union (IPU)
Islamic Development Bank (IDB)
Multilateral Investment Guarantee Agency (MIGA)
Nonaligned Movement (NAM)
Organisation internationale de la Francophonie (OIF)
Organisation of Islamic Cooperation (OIC)
Organisation for the Prohibition of Chemical Weapons (OPCW)
Union Latine
United Nations (UN)
United Nations Conference on Trade and Development (UNCTAD)
United Nations Educational, Scientific, and Cultural Organization (UNESCO)
United Nations High Commissioner for Refugees (UNHCR)
United Nations Industrial Development Organization (UNIDO)
Universal Postal Union (UPU)
West African Development Bank (WADB)
West African Economic and Monetary Union (WAEMU)
World Confederation of Labour (WCL)
World Customs Organization (WCO)
World Federation of Trade Unions (WFTU)
World Health Organization (WHO)
World Intellectual Property Organization (WIPO)
World Meteorological Organization (WMO)
World Tourism Organization (UNWTO)
World Trade Organization (WTO)

Law and order in Ivory Coast 

 Law Enforcement in Ivory Coast
 Constitution of Ivory Coast
 Human rights in Ivory Coast
 LGBT rights in Ivory Coast

Military of Ivory Coast 
Military of Ivory Coast

History of Ivory Coast

Period-coverage
1960 to 1999
1999 to present

History of Ivory Coast, by subject 
Economic history of Ivory Coast

Culture of Ivory Coast 
Culture of Ivory Coast
 Languages of Ivory Coast
 National symbols of Ivory Coast
 Coat of arms of Ivory Coast
 Flag of Ivory Coast
 National anthem of Ivory Coast
 Prostitution in Ivory Coast
 Public holidays in Ivory Coast
 Religion in Ivory Coast
 Hinduism in Ivory Coast
 Islam in Ivory Coast
 World Heritage Sites in Ivory Coast

Art in Ivory Coast 
 Music of Ivory Coast

Sports in Ivory Coast 
 Football in Ivory Coast
 Ivory Coast at the Olympics

Economy and infrastructure of Ivory Coast 
Economy of Ivory Coast
 Economic rank, by nominal GDP (2007): 97th (ninety-seventh)
 Agriculture in Ivory Coast
Cocoa production in Ivory Coast
 Communications in Ivory Coast
 Companies of Ivory Coast
Currency of Ivory Coast: Franc
ISO 4217: XOF
 Energy in Ivory Coast
 Mining in Ivory Coast
 Tourism in Ivory Coast
 Transport in Ivory Coast
 Airports in Ivory Coast
 Rail transport in Ivory Coast

Education in Ivory Coast 
Education in Ivory Coast

Health in Ivory Coast

See also 

Index of Ivory Coast–related articles
List of Ivory Coast-related topics
List of international rankings
Member state of the United Nations
Outline of Africa
Outline of geography

References

External links

Government
 Présidence de la République de Côte d'Ivoire  Official Site of the Ivorian President
Embassy of Côte d'Ivoire in Japan government information and links

News
allAfrica - Côte d'Ivoire news headline links
Abidjan.Net news forum links

Overviews
BBC News - Country Profile: Ivory Coast
Encyclopædia Britannica, Country Page - Côte D'Ivoire
CIA World Factbook - Côte d'Ivoire
Library of Congress Country Study - Ivory Coast data as of November 1988

Culture
Cote D'Ivoire literature at a glance

Directories
The Index on Africa - Côte d'Ivoire directory category

Stanford University - Africa South of the Sahara: Côte d'Ivoire - Ivory Coast directory category
University of Pennsylvania - African Studies Center: Cote d'Ivoire directory category
 Yahoo! - Cote d'Ivoire directory category

Tourism

Travel Overview of Côte d'Ivoire
Lonely Planet - Cote d'Ivoire

Other
Map of Côte d'Ivoire
 Parti Ivoirien du Peuple
Akwaba in Ivory Coast
French intervention in Ivory Coast 2002–2003
 

Ivory Coast